Henry de La Poer Beresford, 2nd Marquess of Waterford KP, PC (Ire) (23 May 1772 – 16 July 1826) styled Lord Le Poer from 1783 until 1789 and Earl of Tyrone from 1789 to 1800, was an Irish peer.

Early life
Beresford was the eldest surviving son of George Beresford, 1st Marquess of Waterford and the former Elizabeth Monck (a granddaughter of Henry Bentinck, 1st Duke of Portland). Among his siblings were the Most Rev. Lord John George, Archbishop of Armagh, Lord George Beresford, Lady Isabella Beresford (wife of Sir John William Head Brydges, MP), and Lady Elizabeth Louisa Beresford (wife of Maj.-Gen. Sir Denis Pack and Sir Thomas Reynell, 6th Baronet).

Career
Beresford entered the Irish House of Commons for Londonderry County in 1790 and sat for the constituency until the Act of Union. In 1798, he also stood for Coleraine but chose not to sit. Beresford became Marquess of Waterford in 1800 after the death of George Beresford, 1st Marquess of Waterford and was appointed a Knight of the Order of St Patrick on 14 March 1806.

Personal life
Beresford married Lady Susanna Carpenter, daughter of George Carpenter, 2nd Earl of Tyrconnell and Sarah Delaval, on 29 August 1805. They had three children:

 Lord George de la Poer Beresford, styled Earl of Tyrone (1810–1824), who died young.
 Lady Sarah Elizabeth Beresford (1807–1884), who married Henry John Chetwynd-Talbot, 18th Earl of Shrewsbury, in 1828.
 Henry Beresford, 3rd Marquess of Waterford (1811–1859), who married Hon. Louisa Stuart, second daughter of Charles Stuart, 1st Baron Stuart de Rothesay and Lady Elizabeth Yorke (a daughter and of Philip Yorke, 3rd Earl of Hardwicke), in 1842.
 John de la Poer Beresford, 4th Marquess of Waterford (1814–1866), who married Christiana Leslie, sister of Sir John Leslie, 1st Baronet, and third daughter of Col. Charles Powell Leslie, MP, in 1843.

Lord Waterford died on 16 July 1826 and was succeeded in the marquessate by his eldest son, Henry.

References

1772 births
1826 deaths
Tyrone, Henry Beresford, Earl of
Tyrone, Henry Beresford, Earl of
Knights of St Patrick
Tyrone, Henry Beresford, Earl of
Members of the Privy Council of Ireland
Henry
2